Delma butleri, also known commonly as Butler's legless lizard, Butler's scalyfoot, the spinifex snake-lizard, and the unbanded delma, is a species of lizard in the family Pygopodidae. The species is endemic to Australia.

Etymology
The specific name, butleri, is in honor of Australian naturalist William Henry "Harry" Butler.

Habitat
The preferred natural habitat of D. butleri is grassland.

Description

Reproduction
D. butleri is oviparous.

References

Further reading
Cogger HG (2014). Reptiles and Amphibians of Australia, Seventh Edition. Clayton, Victoria, Australia: CSIRO Publishing. xxx + 1,033 pp. .
Storr GM (1987). "Three new legless lizards (Pygopodidae) from Western Australia". Records of the Western Australian Museum 13 (4): 345–355. (Delma butleri, new species, pp. 346–349, Figures 1–2).
Wilson S, Swan G (2013). A Complete Guide to Reptiles of Australia, Fourth Edition. Sydney: New Holland Publishers. 522 pp. .

Pygopodids of Australia
Delma
Reptiles described in 1987
Endemic fauna of Australia